Molly Lilly Maria Nilsson (born December 14, 1984) is a Swedish singer-songwriter and musician. She is the owner of an independent record label, Dark Skies Association, founded in 2009. As of 2004, Nilsson resides in Berlin.

Early life 
Nilsson grew up in Stockholm. Both of her parents were communists.

She began her creative pursuits in comics and writing. Soon she began experimenting with a friend's keyboard and transitioned from visual media into songwriting.

Music 

Nilsson moved to Berlin to pursue music. She worked in the cloakroom of Berlin nightclub Berghain, while saving money to write songs on weekends. She released her first album in 2008 titled These Things Take Time, which she released on CD-R with just 500 copies. In 2009, she released another self-produced album, Europa. Nilsson gained more visibility in 2011 when her song "Hey Moon" from These Things Take Time, was covered by John Maus for his album We Must Become the Pitiless Censors of Ourselves. After releasing another album, Zenith, in 2015, Nilsson began a world tour.

Nilsson produces and performs her music on her own, though she co-releases much of her music on Dark Skies Association and Glasgow's Night School Records. Nilsson's style features minimalist arrangements of synthesizers and drum beats and is often categorized as dark pop or lo-fi synth-pop. She cites solitude as a necessary and important part of her creative process. During live performances, Nilsson often sings over a CD of her own work.

One of Nilsson's heroes is Polish socialist Rosa Luxemburg, the subject of Nilsson's song "Obnoxiously Talented". In an interview with Tribune magazine, she said: "[A]part from her work and legacy, I've really developed a relationship with Rosa Luxemburg on a human level. It's great to find people in history who can give you an example of what’s possible, or how you can live your life, or what you should strive for." Nilsson's album Extreme (2022), was released on Luxemburg's birthday, 15 January.

Discography

Albums
 These Things Take Time (2008)
 Europa (2009)
 Follow the Light (2010)
 History (2011)
 The Travels (2013)
 Sólo Paraíso (2014)
 Zenith (2015)
 Imaginations (2017)
 2020 (2018)
 Extreme (2022)

Singles
 "Ugly Girl" / "Wrong Boy" (2016)
 "About Somebody" / "Quit (In Time)" (2017)
 "Hey Moon" / "Silver" (2021 - charity re-release for Black Lives Matter)

References

Swedish pop singers
Musicians from Stockholm
Musicians from Berlin
Swedish expatriates in Germany
Living people
Swedish women in electronic music
Minimal wave musicians
Year of birth uncertain
1984 births